Various elections were held in the United Kingdom in 2003, including:

2003 Scottish Parliament election
2003 National Assembly for Wales election
2003 United Kingdom local elections

2003 elections in the United Kingdom